The second USS Commodore (SP-1425) was an armed motorboat that served in the United States Navy as a patrol vessel from 1917 to 1919. It was financed by Herbert M. Sears as part of the "Eastern Yacht Club 62 footers".

Commodore was built in 1917 by Herreshoff Manufacturing Company at Bristol, Rhode Island, as the civilian motorboat Herreshoff No. 318. The U.S. Navy acquired her in October 1917 for World War I service. She was commissioned as USS Commodore (SP-1425) in mid-November 1917. She spent much of her naval career in Florida waters.

Due to an urgent need for craft such as Commodore at Brest, France, an order dated 14 October 1918 went out from Washington, D.C., to Boston, Massachusetts, directing the Commandant of the 1st Naval District to ready six section patrol boats -- Commodore, USS Cossack (SP-695), USS War Bug (SP-1795), USS Sea Hawk (SP-2365), USS Kangaroo (SP-1284), and USS SP-729—to be shipped to France as deck cargo along with spare parts to keep them operational. However, this proposed movement appears to have been cancelled, probably because of the armistice with Germany of 11 November 1918 that ended World War I and eliminated the need for more U.S. Navy patrol craft in Europe.

Commodore was decommissioned at Naval Air Station Pensacola, Pensacola, Florida, in May 1919. She was transferred to the United States Army in October 1919.

References
 for Commodore
 for SP-729 (ex-Apache)
Department of the Navy: Naval Historical Center: Online Library of Selected Images: U.S. Navy Ships: USS Commodore (SP-1425), 1917-1919
NavSource Online: Section Patrol Craft Photo Archive Commodore (SP 1425)

Patrol vessels of the United States Navy
World War I patrol vessels of the United States
Ships built in Bristol, Rhode Island
1917 ships